Kresty may refer to:
Kresty, Krasnogorodsky District, Pskov Oblast, a village in Krasnogorodsky District of Pskov Oblast, Russia
Kresty, Botalovskaya Volost, Kunyinsky District, Pskov Oblast, a village in Botalovskaya Volost of Kunyinsky District of Pskov Oblast, Russia
Kresty, Dolgovitskaya Volost, Kunyinsky District, Pskov Oblast, a village in Dolgovitskaya Volost of Kunyinsky District of Pskov Oblast, Russia
Kresty, Nevelsky District, Pskov Oblast, a village in Nevelsky District of Pskov Oblast, Russia
Kresty, Vologda Oblast, a village in Vologda Oblast, Russia
Kresty, name of several other rural localities in Russia

See also
Kresty Prison, an infamous prison in Saint Petersburg, Russia